The 2008 COSAFA Cup is the 12th edition of the football tournament that involves teams from Southern Africa.

Due to their internal competitions calendar, Angola decided to send their under-20 national team to play in this tournament  and South Africa will play with a "Development XI"; therefore matches involving Angola and South Africa will not count towards FIFA ranking according to FIFA.

South Africa won the tournament defeating Mozambique 2-1 in the final.

Qualifying
Took place between 19–24 July, group winners qualified for the final tournament.

Group A

  through to quarter finals after a coin toss win.

Group B

Final tournament
Angola, Zambia, South Africa, Mozambique, Zimbabwe and Botswana were seeded directly for the quarter finals according to FIFA World Rankings of April 2008. This decision was made May 21, 2008 and confirmed on July 7, 2008. The actual draw for the 2 qualifying groups and the quarter finals according to these seeds was held on June 10, 2008.

Quarter finals

Semi finals

3rd Place Match

Final

Scorers
4 goals
  Phillip Zialor
  Praxis Rabemananjara

2 goals
  Tovohery Rabenandrasana
  Momed Hagi
  Lazarus Kaimbi
  Quinton Jacobs
  Marchelino Fransch

1 goal
  Moli Lesesa
  Thabane Rankara
  Fisher Kondowe
  Chiukepo Msowoya
  Johan Marmitte
  Wesley Marquette
  Tico-Tico
  Nito
  Gerson Txuma
  Jamuovandu Ngatjizeko
  Don Anacoura
  Collin Laporte
  Trevor Poiret
  Rooi Mahamutsa
  Lefa Tsutsulupa
  Phinda Dlamini
  Gcina Mazibuko
  Mfanzile Dlamini
  Emmanuel Mayuka
  Francis Kombe

References

External links
 Information at RSSSF archives
 BBC Sport:  Cosafa Cup draw
 People's Online Daily: African regional tournament COSAFA Cup makes draw
  Flames seeded in COSAFA Cup
 Zambia Handed Bye in 2008 Cosafa Challenge Cup

COSAFA Cup
COSAFA Cup
COSAFA Cup
International association football competitions hosted by South Africa